The Franco-Spanish War (1635–1659) was fought between France and Spain, with the participation of a changing list of allies through the war. The first phase, beginning in May 1635 and ending with the 1648 Peace of Westphalia, is considered a related conflict of the Thirty Years' War. The second phase continued until 1659 when France and Spain agreed to peace terms in the Treaty of the Pyrenees.

Major areas of conflict included northern Italy, the Spanish Netherlands, and the German Rhineland. In addition, France supported revolts against Spanish rule in Portugal (1640–1668), Catalonia (1640–1653) and Naples (1647), while from 1647 to 1653 Spain backed French rebels in the civil war known as the Fronde. Both also backed opposing sides in the 1639 to 1642 Piedmontese Civil War.

France avoided direct participation in the Thirty Years' War until May 1635 when it declared war on Spain and the Holy Roman Empire, entering the conflict as an ally of the Dutch Republic and Sweden. After Westphalia in 1648, the war continued between Spain and France, with neither side able to achieve decisive victory. France made gains in Flanders and along the north-eastern end of the Pyrenees, but by 1658 both sides were financially exhausted, leading them to make peace in November 1659.

French territorial gains were minor but strengthened the kingdom's borders; additionally, Louis XIV married Maria Theresa of Spain, eldest daughter of Philip IV of Spain. Spain retained a vast global empire and remained a leading power in Europe, but the treaty marked the beginning of a gradual loss of its European predominance, in favor of a rising France under Louis XIV.

Strategic overview

17th century Europe was dominated by the struggle between the Bourbon kings of France, and their Habsburg rivals in Spain and the Holy Roman Empire. Until the mid 20th century, the Thirty Years' War was primarily seen as a German religious conflict; in 1938, historian CV Wedgwood argued that it formed part of a wider, ongoing European struggle, with the Habsburg-Bourbon conflict at its centre. Modern historians sometimes refer to the Franco-Spanish War as a 'declared war', the formal part of a much wider contest with many different locations and participants.

During the 1620s, France was threatened internally by a series of Huguenot rebellions, and externally by Habsburg possessions on its borders in the Spanish Netherlands, Franche-Comté, Alsace, Roussillon and Lorraine. Prior to 1635, it sought to weaken both branches of the Habsburgs by financing their opponents, including the Dutch, clients in Northern Italy and the Grisons, the Ottomans, the Venetian Republic, Transylvania, and Sweden. After 1635, France intervened directly through anti-Habsburg alliances with the Dutch and Swedish, while supporting insurgents in Portugal, Catalonia and Naples

For their part, the Habsburgs backed the Huguenots and numerous conspiracies led by the feudal lords who resented their loss of power under Cardinal Richelieu and his successor, Cardinal Mazarin. The most significant included the 1632 Montmorency plot, the 1641 Princes des Paix rising, and Cinq-Mars in 1642. Spain also financed the 1648 to 1653 civil war known as the Fronde.

Wider co-operation between the Spanish and Austrian Habsburgs was limited, since their objectives did not always align; Spain was a global maritime power, Austria primarily a European land power, focused on the Holy Roman Empire, which contained over 1,800 members, most extremely small. Although a Habsburg had been Holy Roman Emperor since 1440, their control over the Empire was weakened by the 1555 Peace of Augsburg, and this continued in the period leading up to 1620. Reversing this trend was a major Habsburg objective during the Thirty Years War, but they acknowledged failure in the 1648 Treaty of Westphalia.

France faced the same issue of diverging objectives with its allies. The war coincided with the period of economic supremacy known as the Dutch Golden Age, and by 1640, many Dutch statesmen viewed French ambitions in the Spanish Netherlands as a threat. Unlike France, Swedish war aims were restricted to Germany, and in 1641, they considered a separate peace with Ferdinand.

From the late 16th century, Italy, especially the Kingdom of Naples, was the primary source of soldiers and money for the Spanish Army of Flanders. As a result, much of the fighting focused on the Spanish Road, an overland supply route connecting Spanish possessions in Italy with Flanders, but which also passed through areas considered vital to French security, like Alsace. The independent Duchy of Savoy and Spanish-held Duchy of Milan were not only strategically important to the Road, but also provided access to the vulnerable southern borders of France, and Habsburg territories in Austria. Richelieu aimed to end Spanish dominance in these areas, an objective largely achieved by the time he died in 1642.

Until the advent of railways in the 19th century, water was the primary means of bulk transportation, and campaigns focused on control of rivers and ports. Armies relied on foraging, while feeding the draught animals essential for transport and cavalry restricted campaigning in the winter. By the 1630s, the countryside had been devastated by years of constant warfare, which limited the size of armies and their ability to conduct operations. Sickness killed far more soldiers than combat; the French army that invaded Flanders in May 1635 was reduced by desertion and disease from 27,000 to under 17,000 by early July.

Background

The Thirty Years' War began in 1618 when the Protestant-dominated Bohemian Estates offered the Crown of Bohemia to Frederick of the Palatinate, rather than the conservative Catholic, Emperor Ferdinand II. Most of the Holy Roman Empire remained neutral, viewing it as an inheritance dispute, and the revolt was quickly suppressed. However, when Frederick refused to admit defeat, Imperial forces invaded the Palatinate and forced him into exile; removal of a hereditary prince changed the nature and extent of the war. Combined with a renewed Counter-Reformation, it presented a direct threat both to Protestant states within the Empire and external powers who held Imperial territories. They included the Dutch Prince of Orange, hereditary ruler of Nassau-Dillenburg, and Christian IV of Denmark, who was also Duke of Holstein-Gottorp. This presented Richelieu with additional opportunities to weaken his Habsburg opponents in Spain and the Empire, while avoiding direct conflict.

As a result, Catholic France supported the Protestant Dutch Republic in its war with Spain, as well as funding first Danish, then Swedish intervention in the Empire. In 1630, Gustavus Adolphus of Sweden invaded Pomerania; while done partly to support his Protestant co-religionists, he also sought control of the Baltic trade, which provided much of Sweden's income. Swedish intervention continued after his death at Lützen in 1632, but caused tensions with Saxony and Brandenburg-Prussia, whose lands were devastated by the plague and famine that accompanied the war. A significant Imperial-Spanish victory at Nördlingen in September 1634 forced the Swedes to abandon southern Germany, while most of their German allies used the opportunity to make peace with Ferdinand II at Prague in April 1635.

The other major European conflict of the period was the Eighty Years' War (1568-1648) between Spain and the Dutch Republic, suspended in 1609 by the Twelve Years' Truce. The Spanish strongly objected to its commercial provisions and when Philip IV became king in 1621, he resumed the war. The cost proved extremely high, increased after 1628 by a proxy war with France over the Mantuan succession. While the Spanish Empire reached its maximum nominal extent under Philip's rule, its size and complexity made it increasingly difficult to govern, or enact essential reforms. Despite this, depth of resources consistently allowed them to recover from defeats that would have shattered other powers, while new regulations passed in 1631 and 1632 were key to improved Spanish military performance in the first part of the war.

In 1628, the Dutch captured the Spanish treasure fleet, which they used to finance the capture of 's-Hertogenbosch the following year. The powerful Amsterdam mercantile lobby saw this as an opportunity to end the war; negotiations ended without result in 1633, but strengthened the peace party. The Peace of Prague led to rumours of a proposed Austro-Spanish offensive in the Netherlands, leading Louis XIII of France and Richelieu to decide on direct intervention. In early 1635, they signed an agreement with Bernard of Saxe-Weimar to provide 16,000 troops for a campaign in Alsace and the Rhineland, forming an anti-Spanish alliance with the Dutch, as well as signing the Treaty of Compiègne with Sweden.

Phase I: 1635 to the 1648, Treaty of Westphalia

In May, a French army of 27,000 invaded the Spanish Netherlands and defeated a smaller Spanish force at Les Avins, then besieged Leuven on 24 June, where they were joined by Dutch reinforcements. Disease and lack of supplies quickly reduced the besieging army, which withdrew in the face of a relief force under Ottavio Piccolomini on 4 July. Led by Cardinal-Infante Ferdinand of Austria, the Spanish took the initiative and captured Limbourg, Gennep, Diest, Goch, then besieged Dutch garrisons in the Duchy of Cleves. The French retreated across the border while the Dutch under Frederick Henry marched urgently on the strategic position of Schenkenschans. Captured by the Spanish on 28 July, it was recovered only after a long and costly siege.

Following this failure, the States General of the Netherlands opposed further large scale land operations in favour of attacks on Spanish trade. In the campaign of 1636, Philip switched his focus to recovering territories in the Low Countries, while a Franco-Savoyard offensive in Lombardy was defeated at Tornavento in June. A Spanish incursion into northern France captured the key fortified town of Corbie in August but despite causing panic in Paris, lack of supplies forced them to retreat in September and the attack was not repeated.

As agreed at Compiègne in 1635, the French replaced Swedish garrisons in Alsace; prior to his death in 1639, Bernard of Saxe-Weimar won a series of victories over the Imperials in the Rhineland, notably the capture of Breisach in December 1638. Severing the Spanish Road meant their armies in Flanders had to be resupplied by sea, making them vulnerable to attack by the Dutch navy, which destroyed a large Spanish fleet at the Battle of the Downs in 1639. Although most convoys managed to get through, it illustrated the difficulties Spain faced in sustaining its war effort in the Low Countries.

With Spanish resources stretched to the limit in Europe, the Dutch used the opportunity to attack their possessions in the Americas, Africa and Asia, especially those belonging to the Portuguese Empire, then also ruled by Philip IV; Spanish inability to protect these interests caused increasing unrest in Portugal. Damage to the economy and tax increases imposed to pay for the war led to protests throughout Spanish territories, which in 1640 erupted into open revolts in Portugal and Catalonia. In 1641, the Catalan Courts recognised Louis XIII of France as Count of Barcelona, and ruler of the Principality of Catalonia. However, they soon found the new administration differed little from the old, turning the war into a three sided contest between the Franco-Catalan elite, the rural peasantry, and the Spanish.

Louis XIII died on 14 May 1643, and was succeeded by his five-year-old son, Louis XIV, whose mother, Anne of Austria, took control of the Regency Council that ruled in his name. Five days later, Condé, then known as the duc d'Enghien, defeated the Spanish Army of Flanders at Rocroi; while less decisive than often thought, the loss of this highly experienced unit ended Spanish dominance of the European battlefield. It gave Condé, a member of the royal family, and effective ruler of large parts of eastern France, leverage in his struggle with Anne, and Cardinal Mazarin.

Despite some successes in northern France and the Spanish Netherlands, including victory at Lens in August 1648, France was unable to knock Spain out of the war. In the Holy Roman Empire, Imperial victories at Tuttlingen and Mergentheim were offset by French success at Nördlingen and Zusmarshausen. In Italy, French-backed Savoyard offensives against the Spanish-ruled Duchy of Milan achieved little, due to lack of resources and the disruption caused by the 1639 to 1642 Piedmontese Civil War. Victory at Orbetello in June 1646, and the recapture of Naples in 1647 left Spain firmly in control of this region.

The 1648 Peace of Westphalia ended the Thirty Years War and recognised Dutch independence, ending the drain on Spanish resources. Under the October 1648 Treaty of Münster, France gained strategic locations in Alsace and Lorraine, as well as Pinerolo, which controlled access to Alpine passes in Northern Italy. However, the peace excluded Italy, Imperial territories in the Low Countries, and French-occupied Lorraine; although Emperor Ferdinand agreed to remain neutral, fighting continued.

Phase II: 1648 to 1659

After Philip declared bankruptcy in 1647, he reduced expenditure by prioritizing the retaking Catalonia while remaining on the defensive elsewhere. In addition, many of his best troops had been lost at Rocroi and parts of Flanders overrun, including the key port of Dunkirk, a centre for Spanish privateer attacks on Dutch and French shipping. However, his position improved after the Peace of Westphalia ended the Dutch war, while political and economic turmoil in France led to civil war or Fronde.

Philip initially hoped simply to improve the terms on offer from France, but the Fronde allowed him to make substantial gains in the Netherlands, including retaking Ypres. Elsewhere, neither side was able to win a significant advantage; in 1650, Spanish success in crushing the Neapolitan Revolt was offset by the loss of Barcelona to French backed Catalan rebels. Mazarin forced Condé into exile in the Spanish Netherlands in 1651, where his immense prestige in territories adjacent to the Spanish possession of Franche-Comté made him a valuable ally for Philip.

Over the course of 1652, Spain recaptured both Dunkirk and Barcelona, and although limited combat continued in Roussillon, by 1653 the front had stabilised along the modern Pyrenees border. However, doing so forced Philip into bankruptcy again, while the end of the Fronde allowed Mazarin to resume attacks on Milan, possession of which would allow France to threaten Habsburg Austria. The attempt failed despite support from Savoy, Modena and Portugal. By now, the two antagonists were exhausted, with neither able to establish dominance; from 1654 to 1656, major French victories at Arras, Landrecies and Saint-Ghislain were offset by Spanish victories at Pavia and Valenciennes. Under pressure from the Pope, Mazarin offered peace terms but refused to accept Philip's insistence Condé be restored to his French titles and lands. Since Philip viewed this as a personal obligation, the war continued.

France had previously relied on the Dutch to provide naval support against Spain, which ended after Westphalia; in 1657, Mazarin replaced this loss by negotiating an anti-Spanish alliance with the English Commonwealth. This expanded the scope of the Anglo-Spanish War (1654–1660), while France withdrew support for the exiled Charles II of England, whose supporters joined the Spanish as a result. After the Anglo-French capture of Dunkirk in June 1658, Philip requested a truce, which Mazarin refused, but once again success proved illusory. On 15 August, Spain won an important victory at Camprodon in Catalonia, Cromwell's death in September led to political chaos in England, while fighting in northern Italy ended when French allies Savoy and Modena agreed to a truce with Spanish commander Caracena.

Treaty of the Pyrenees and marriage contract

On 8 May 1659, France and Spain began negotiating terms; the death of Oliver Cromwell in September 1658 weakened England, which was allowed to observe but excluded from the talks. Although the Anglo-Spanish War was suspended after the 1660 restoration of Charles II, it did not formally end until the 1667 Treaty of Madrid.

Under the Treaty of the Pyrenees, signed on 5 November 1659, France gained Artois and Hainaut along its border with the Spanish Netherlands, as well as Roussillon. These were more significant than often assumed; in combination with the 1648 Treaty of Münster, France strengthened its borders in the east and south-west, while in 1662, Charles II sold Dunkirk to France. Acquisition of Roussillon established the Franco-Spanish border along the Pyrenees, but divided the historic Principality of Catalonia, an event still commemorated each year by French Catalan-speakers in Perpignan. In addition to these territorial loses, Spain was forced to recognize and confirm all of the French territorial gains at the Peace of Westphalia.

France withdrew support from Afonso VI of Portugal, while Louis XIV renounced his claim to be Count of Barcelona, and king of Catalonia. Condé regained his possessions and titles, as did many of his followers, such as the Comte de Montal, but his political power was broken, and he did not hold military command again until 1667.

An integral part of the peace negotiations was the marriage contract between Louis and Maria Theresa, which he used to justify the 1666 to 1667 War of Devolution, and formed the basis of French claims over the next 50 years. The marriage was more significant than intended, since it was agreed shortly after Philip's second wife, Mariana of Austria, gave birth to a second son, both of whom died young. Philip died in 1665, leaving his four-year-old son Charles as king, once described as "always on the verge of death, but repeatedly baffling Christendom by continuing to live."

Aftermath and historical assessment

Traditional scholarship viewed the war as a French victory that marked the start of France's rise, replacing Spain as the predominant European power. More recent assessments argue this relies on hindsight, and that while France made crucial strategic gains around its borders, the outcome was far more balanced. One view is that the two parties effectively settled for a draw, and that had France not moderated its demands in 1659, Spain would have continued fighting.

"The (1659 treaty) was a peace of equals. Spanish losses were not great, and France returned some territory and strongholds. With hindsight, historians have regarded the treaty as a symbol of the 'decline of Spain' and the 'ascendancy of France'; at that time, however, (it) appeared a far from decisive verdict on the international hierarchy".

"Spain maintained her supremacy in Europe until 1659, and was the greatest imperial power for years after that. Although (its) economic and military power suffered an abrupt decline in the half century after (1659), (it) was a major participant in the European coalitions against Louis XIV, and the peace congresses at Nijmegen in 1678, and Ryswick in 1697".

David Parrott, Professor of Early Modern History at New College, Oxford claims the Peaces of Westphalia and the Pyrenees both reflected mutual exhaustion and stalemate, not a "military diktat imposed by victorious powers". Elsewhere, he labels the Franco-Spanish War as "25 years of indecisive, over-ambitious and, on occasions, truly disastrous conflict".

Financial and military impact
Taking on the Spanish Empire, then the largest military power in Europe, required French forces of unprecedented size and an associated expansion of the taxation and supply base needed to support them. To meet these needs, official estimates for the army expanded from 39,000 in 1630 to around 150,000 shortly before the declaration of war in May 1635. However, at this stage the French state was unable to support such large numbers; of the 27,000 men who took part in the invasion of the Spanish Netherlands in May of the same year, fewer than 15,000 remained a month later. Throughout the war, both sides struggled to support offensives outside their own boundaries; the Spanish invasion of northern France in 1636 collapsed due to lack of supplies and was not repeated.

Including those supplied by Bernard of Saxe-Weimar and paid by France, between 1635 and 1642 official troop levels averaged 150,000 to 160,000, with a peak of 211,000 in 1639. These are based on official muster rolls and should be treated with caution, since officers were paid for numbers reported, rather than those actually present; in addition, during this period on average another 10% was absent due to sickness, although most generally recovered. Parrott estimates variances between "Reported" and "Actual" averaged up to 35% for the French and 50% for the Spanish. Historian John A. Lynn suggests an average of 60% "Reported" versus "Actual" "provides the most reasonable guide", a figure based on André Corvisier's 1964 work L'armée française de la fin du XVIIe siècle au ministère de Choiseul.

Throughout the war, logistics remained the major constraint on the number of troops, while strategy was often subordinated to the need to find adequate provisions, especially given the primitive infrastructure then available. It was not until the 1660s that Louvois created the support systems that allowed France to sustain an army of nearly 200,000 men for extended periods, and crucially ensure co-ordinated strategy between different fronts.  The more experienced Spanish were better equipped in this respect while their resources made it easier to replace losses of men and material. These advantages could be offset by engaging them on multiple fronts while attacking their lines of communication, a tactic the French used throughout the war by supporting the Catalan, Neapolitan and Portuguese rebels along with allies in Northern Italy and the Rhineland. Loss of Dutch naval support after 1648 severely impacted their ability to challenge the Spanish at sea, until replaced with the English alliance in 1657.

At its peak in 1632, the Spanish army contained around 300,000 regulars, exclusive of local militia and the empire increasingly relied on its Italian territories for recruits and money. Historian Davide Maffi calculates the Duchy of Milan provided an annual 6 million scudi for the war, as well as an average of 4,000 recruits per year. The Grand Duchy of Tuscany, a de facto Spanish protectorate was required to supply 17,000 scudi a month, as well as provide ships for the fleet and soldiers for the Army of Flanders. In 1631 to 1636 alone, Naples provided 3.5 million scudi, significant naval resources and 53,500 recruits for the Spanish army, more than Castile from a population half the size. 

In addition to supporting its own army and navy, from 1630 to 1643 Naples supplied an average of 10,000 soldiers a year to the Spanish army, provided an annual subsidy of one million ducats to support other areas of the Spanish Empire, and paid a third of Milan's government expenditures. As a result, its public debt quintupled and by 1648 interest payments constituted 57% of the kingdom's revenue. In both Naples and Sicily, taxes tripled between 1618 and 1688; Philip sought to mitigate the impact by providing tax exemption for the elderly and poor and increasing consumption taxes on the wealthy, but this and other measures had the indirect effect of crushing the southern Italian economy.

Despite its power, the Spanish army was subject to constant supply shortages throughout the twenty five year conflict. By the end of it, both states were exhausted. When the commander of the Army of Extremadura requested 3,000 quintales (138 tons) of gunpowder for the 1659 campaign in Portugal, the central Junta of War for Spain revealed that total supplies for defense in the peninsula (including the navy, coastal garrisons, and militia in addition to  the three major war fronts in Catalonia, Extremadura and Galicia) were only 1427 quintales (66 tons) due to so much powder having been spent in the fight against France. Shortages were particularly prominent among the militia and reserve forces. In 1632, 70% of the 44,000 men in Castile's militias were "unarmed" (as in, armed only with swords or similar weapons rather than firearms or pikes) due to a shortage of arquebuses. With the outbreak of war, this situation quickly improved so that by 1636 only 25% of militiamen in Castile were armed with hand weapons alone, with 25% carrying pikes and the remaining 50% arquebuses and muskets. By the end of the conflict, however, the situation had deteriorated once again, with more than 87 percent of the 465,000 militiamen listed in Castilian registers classed as "unarmed".

In October 1647, discontent led to revolts in both Sicily and Naples; although quickly suppressed, it exposed the weakness of Spanish rule in Italy and the alienation of the local elites from Madrid. In 1650, the governor of Milan wrote that as well as widespread dissatisfaction in the south, the only one of the Italian states that could be relied on was the Duchy of Parma.

Notes

References

Sources
 
 
 
 
 
 
 
 
 
 
 
 
 
 
 
 
 
 
 
 
 
 
 
 
 
 
 
 
 
 
 
 
 
 
 
 
 
 
 
 
 
 
 
 
 
 
 

 
17th-century conflicts
17th century in France
17th-century military history of Spain
Civil wars involving the states and peoples of Europe
Civil wars of the Early Modern period
Wars involving France
Wars involving Spain
Military history of the Ancien Régime
France–Spain military relations
1630s conflicts
1640s conflicts
1650s conflicts
1630s in France
1640s in France
1650s in France
1630s in Spain
1640s in Spain
1650s in Spain
1635 beginnings
1659 endings